Altavalle is a comune (municipality) in Trentino in the northern Italian region Trentino-Alto Adige/Südtirol. It was formed on 1 January 2016 as the merger of the previous communes of Faver, Grauno, Grumes and Valda.

References

External links
 Official website

Cities and towns in Trentino-Alto Adige/Südtirol